Riverside Park is a neighbourhood in the south end of Ottawa, Canada.

It is bounded on the north by Brookfield Road, on the east by the Airport Parkway, on the south by the CN rail tracks and on the west by the Rideau River. 

The neighbourhood includes one of Ottawa's most well known beaches at Mooney's Bay and the Terry Fox Athletic Facility, along with both Vincent Massey Park, Hog's Back Park. Confederation Heights sits at the northern tip of the neighbourhood. It also includes the Ottawa Hunt and Golf Club, which has hosted professional and amateur golf tournaments.

The area is served by Brookfield High School and the General Vanier, Bayview Public Schools, Georges Étienne Cartier as well as the Holy Cross Catholic School. In addition to Mooney's Bay, the area is served by four other parks; Paget Park, Marble Park, Flannery Park and Pauline Vanier Park, adjacent to General Vanier Public School.

In August 2007, Bayview Public School was closed at its site on Riverside drive. Its French immersion program moved to the R. Byrns Curry Public School building (renamed Bayview Public School).  R. Byrns Curry students were reassigned to General Vanier Public School (J-K to grade 3) and Fielding Drive Public School (grades 4 to 8).

The neighbourhood is bifurcated by OCRR Railway. The area west of it is known as Riverside Park West and the area east of it is called Riverside Park East. The area to the south of Walkley Road is known as Riverside Park South.

According to the Canada 2011 Census, the population of the neighbourhood north of Walkley (Census Tract 5050003.00) was 4564 and south of Walkley (Census Tract 5050002.01) was 2893 for a total of 7457.

References

External links
Riverside Park Community and Recreation Association

Neighbourhoods in Ottawa